Russia competed at the 1998 Winter Olympics in Nagano, Japan.

Medalists

Alpine skiing 

Men

Women

Biathlon 

Men

Women

Bobsleigh

Cross-country skiing 

Men

Women

Figure skating

Freestyle skiing 

Men

Women

Ice hockey 

Men
Head coach:  Vladimir Yurzinov

Preliminary round

Play-off
Quarterfinal

Semifinal

Final

Luge

Nordic combined

Short track speed skating 

Women

Ski jumping

Speed skating 

Men

Women

References
Official Olympic Reports
International Olympic Committee results database

Nations at the 1998 Winter Olympics
1998
Winter Olympics